The Democratic Revolutionary Council ( or CDR), active in Chad, was a faction of  FROLINAT founded by Ahmat Acyl and later headed by Acheikh ibn Oumar and was also known as the New Vulcan Army.

See also
Chadian Civil War (disambiguation)
Toyota War

References

Chadian–Libyan War
Rebel groups in Chad